Le Portel is a commune in the Pas-de-Calais department in the Hauts-de-France region of France.

Geography
It has a beach and the white cliffs of the English coast can be seen across the sea on clear days.

History
Le Portel translates as "the little port." The original Le Portel was a hamlet east of the town of Outreau. It became an independent municipality on 13 June 1856 by an imperial decree of Napoleon III. 
In the 19th century, flint tools were discovered in the centre of the village, by the river near the Hamel Bridge, evidence of the long occupation of the site. A Gallo-Roman cemetery has been excavated in the hamlet of Châtillon.

Of agricultural origin, it grew rapidly during the 19th century because of fishing, along with the nearby port of Boulogne-sur-Mer. Sailors of Portel were as numerous as those of Boulogne before World War I. In 1841, two Le Portel sailors were on the ship Belle Poule, that brought back the remains of Napoleon.

During the Second World War, on 8 and 9 September 1943, Le Portel suffered as part of Operation Cockade, a diversionary manoeuvre by the Allies to fool the Germans into believing the possibility of a landing on the English Channel. The bombings, which destroyed 93% of the village, also killed 376 civilians. On 12 August 1944, Charles de Gaulle was at Le Portel for its liberation. The town received the Croix de guerre with silver star for its sacrifice.

Population

Places of interest
 Two twentieth century churches.
 Fort de l'Heurt, built from 1803/1805 by order of Napoleon Bonaparte.
 Fort d'Alprech, built in 1883.
 The lighthouse.
 The Fort de Couppes 1883 .
 The Atlantic Wall German fortress.

Notable people
 Alfred Desenclos, composer, was born here.
 Lucien Leduc, football player, was born here.

Twin towns
  Portel-des-Corbières, France
  Stockelsdorf, Germany
  Kawara, Burkina Faso

Sport
The ESSM Le Portel is a French basketball club, based in Le Portel.

See also
Communes of the Pas-de-Calais department

References

Bibliography

External links

 Official town website 
 Official Tourist website of Le Portel Plage 
 Official website: Tourism in Boulogne and in the Boulonnais region
 Association de Sauvegarde du Fort de l'Heurt et du Patrimoine Portelois  
 Web site on the history of Le Portel Plage 

Portel
Seaside resorts in France